Three ships of the Royal Navy have borne the name HMS Traveller:

  was a wooden paddle vessel purchased in 1839 and sold into mercantile service in 1844.
  was an  wooden screw gunboat launched in 1856 and broken up by 1863.
 HMS Traveller was a special service vessel in 1902.
  was a T-class submarine launched in 1941 and sunk by an unknown cause in 1942.

References

 

Royal Navy ship names